is a retired Japanese-born American mathematician, specializing in number theory and algebraic groups.

Early life and education
Ono was born in Nishinomiya, Japan. He received his Ph.D. in 1958 at Nagoya University.

Career
Ono immigrated to the United States after receiving an invitation from J. Robert Oppenheimer to work at the Institute for Advanced Study with a fellowship for the two academic years from 1959 to 1961 and then went to the University of British Columbia to work as an assistant professor of mathematics from 1961 to 1964. From 1964 to 1969 Ono was a tenured professor at the University of Pennsylvania. From 1969 to his retirement in 2011, he was a professor at Johns Hopkins University. In 1966 he was an invited speaker at the International Congress of Mathematicians in Moscow. In 2012 he was elected a Fellow of the American Mathematical Society.

Personal life
Ono's youngest son, Ken Ono, is also a mathematician and professor at the University of Virginia as well as a former triathlete. His middle son, Santa J. Ono, is serving as the 15th President of the University of Michigan (previously the President and Vice-Chancellor of the University of British Columbia) and is a biomedical researcher. His eldest son, Momoro Ono, is a music professor at Creighton University.

Selected publications
 1959: 
 1961: 
 1963: 
 1964: 
 1965: 
 1965: 
 1969: 
 1969: 
 1990: , 
 1994: 
 2008:

References

External links
Takashi Ono at Department of Mathematics, Johns Hopkins University

1928 births
Living people
Number theorists
Algebraic geometers
20th-century Japanese mathematicians
20th-century American mathematicians
21st-century Japanese mathematicians
21st-century American mathematicians
Nagoya University alumni
Johns Hopkins University faculty
People from Nishinomiya
Japanese emigrants to the United States
American academics of Japanese descent
Fellows of the American Mathematical Society
Institute for Advanced Study visiting scholars